The Philippine Bowling Congress Inc. or more popularly known as Philippine Bowling Congress and PBC was the governing body for tenpin bowling in the Philippines from 1977 to 2016. The Philippine Bowling Federation Inc. PBF  replaced it as the appointed member of the International Bowling Federation (IBF), Asian Bowling Federation (ABF), and Philippine Olympic Committee (POC). in 2016.

History
The POC member organization PBC registered with the Securities Exchange Commission (SEC) on September 24, 1975, with a 25-year corporate term and Col. Nereo C. Andolong as its President and representative to the POC. He was elected the second president of the Philippine Olympic Committee in 1977.  Col. Andolong became a Director and President of PBC through Magallanes Bowling Association (MBA), founded with Vicente Sotto III.

Philippine Bowling Congress SEC registration was officially revoked in 2003 when it allowed its corporate term to expire without complying with law requirements to extend its corporate period of existence stated in the articles of incorporation. However, it continued its usual business as the member association recognized by the governing bodies. Despite this, a new organization bearing a confusingly similar name, Philippine Bowling Congress (PBCI) Inc., was registered with SEC in January 2009 and assumed the role of PBC without valid authorization. This confusingly similar corporation never applied for membership and was never officially recognized by any governing body; instead, only the original member, Philippine Bowling Congress, remained affiliated. POC identified the Officers of PBCI from 2009 to 2016 as that of PBC. Per Philippine law, these are two different entities. Philippine Bowling Congress membership with the POC was also eventually revoked.

In early 2016, after the resignation of the newly elected President and Vice President of PBCI, the Philippine Olympic Committee established a caretaker body that will temporarily handle the affairs of Philippine bowling, and POC appointed secretary general Steve Hontiveros who was the last President of the defunct Philippine Bowling Congress Inc.

Presidents of PBC before POC Recognition

Ernesto A. Lopa established the Philippine Bowling Federation in 1968 before co-founding the PBC in 1969.  He was also Fédération Internationale des Quilleurs Asian Zone Vice President from 1973-1976.  He was also elected to the FIQ World Presidium in London England from 1975-1977.

PBC Presidents While POC Recognized

The Philippine Bowling Congress, Inc. was registered with the Securities Exchange Commission on September 24, 1975 S.E.C. Reg. No. 63697.  Its first official president was Nereo C. Andolong who was also the second president of the Philippine Olympic Committee from 1977-1980.

 In 1985, PBC amended the composition of the Board of Directors;
 Col. Irwin Ver did not complete his term and was succeeded by his Vice President Stephen C. Hontiveros in 1986.
 In 1988 amended Art. III of the Articles of Incorporation; 
 In 1993 amended the term of the president to four years, to synchronize it with the term of the POC election, all other officers were for two years and was scheduled after the 1994 term of three years.  The position of Chairman was also added, the Chairmen who served in 1994 were Senator Franklin Drillon (then Justice Secretary) and former PSC Commissioner Philip Ella Juico (PBL Commissioner);
 In October 1997, the Amendment Committee headed by Arch. Edgar Reformado moved to change the manner of election in the By-Laws (to trustee election) among others and extension of corporate term in the Articles of Incorporation.  However, PBC allowed its corporate term to expire without complying with the requirements provided by law for the extension of its corporate term of existence during the presidency of Arch. Ric Poblete.
 Stephen C. Hontiveros was elected President of Fédération Internationale des Quilleurs, the governing body of Tenpin Bowling, 2003-2007.

Presidents of PBCI recognized as PBC

Athletes and their Achievements
The Philippine has produced multi-world champions Paeng Nepomuceno, Lita dela Rosa and Bong Coo, world champions Oliver Ongtawco, Cj Suarrez, Biboy Rivera, Team Trios Gold medalists Liza Del Rosario, Liza Clutario and Cecilia Yap and Olympic Gold Medalist Arianne Cerdeña.

Paeng Nepomuceno and Bong Coo were inducted to the International Bowling Hall of Fame in 1993.  Lita Dela Rosa was posthumously inducted in 2000.  All three were elected to the Philippine Sports Hall of Fame in 2019.

1988 Summer Olympic Games
Bowling at the 1988 Summer Olympics was a demonstration sport for the first, and so far only time. In all, a total of 20 nations competed in the exhibition, which was held on September 18 at the Seoul's Royal Bowling Center.  Nonetheless, Arianne Cerdeña won for the Philippines its first gold medal in the Olympic Games.

Results

WTBA World Tenpin Bowling Championship
The World Tenpin Bowling Championships is a global event that invites all countries that are members of the World Bowling to participate. This tournament is held every 4th year until 2006.  It is the most prestigious tournament in the bowling world.

Men

Women

Women's medal table

As 2019

Men's medal table

As 2018

World Games

QubicaAMF Bowling World Cup

World Youth Bowling Championships

The World Youth Bowling Championships was spearheaded by Philippine Junior Bowlers President Peping Cojuangco (now POC President) in 1991.  The Cojuanco Cup is awarded each year to the winningest country.  It is on its 13th edition held in Nebraska, United States in August 2016.

Boys

Asian Games

Men

Women

Medal table

Southeast Asian Games

Upon the return of past PBC President Ernesto "Toti" Lopa, the Men's team medalled in all five events at the 26th Southeast Asian Games.

Sources includes the European Bowling Federation, World Bowling, Asian Bowling Federation

References

External links
 Men's Singles Medalists
 Men's Doubles Medalists
 Men's Trios Medalists
 Men's Team of 5 Medalists
 Women's Singles Medalists
 Women's Doubles Medalists
 Women's Trios Medalists
 Women's All Events Medalists
 Women's Masters Medalists
 

Bowling organizations
Bowling